Walpole Island (French: Île de Walpole) is a small and uninhabited French island,  east of New Caledonia in the South Pacific. Although it is geographically part of the Loyalty Islands, administratively it belongs to L'Île-des-Pins municipality of New Caledonia.

History 
There is evidence that the island had prehistoric inhabitants. Graves, shell and bone tools, as well as stone markers indicate the presence of a permanent population at some point.  The island is the topic of several oral traditions from Maré and the Île des Pines, the two closest inhabited islands.  Speculation amongst the overseers of the Guano mining operation suggested that shipwreck or other castaways had also occupied the island. British captain Butler is credited for discovery of the island in 1794 and he named it after his ship .

From 1910 through 1936 guano was mined on the island and about 150,000 tonnes were exported to New Zealand.

The island is only visited by scientific naturalist research missions.

Geography 

Walpole is a coral island of volcanic origin.  During the last glaciation cycles, the island was submerged and rose several times, creating a coral capping. The island is bordered by eroding cliffs. On the eastern shore is a narrow plain. The island has no source of surface fresh water.

Important Bird Area
The island has been recognised as an Important Bird Area (IBA) by BirdLife International because it supports breeding populations of brown boobiess, red-bellied fruit doves and Melanesian flycatchers.

See also

 Desert island
 List of islands

References

Uninhabited islands of New Caledonia
Important Bird Areas of New Caledonia
Seabird colonies
Loyalty Islands
Coral islands